The Worshipful Company of Bakers is one of the Livery Companies of the City of London. The Bakers' Guild is known to have existed in the twelfth century. From the Corporation of London, the Guild received the power to enforce regulations for baking, known as the Assize of Bread and Ale. The violations included selling short-weight bread and the addition of sand instead of flour. The Bread Assize remained in force until 1863, when Parliament repealed it.

In the 14th century, the Guild divided into the Brown-Bakers' Guild and the White-Bakers' Guild. The Brown-Bakers were bakers of nutritious bread, while the White-Bakers were bakers of the less nutritious but more popular bread. The White-Bakers were incorporated by a Royal Charter of 1509, while the Brown-Bakers were incorporated in 1621. The White and Brown Bakers united into one Company in 1645. The new Company acquired a new Charter in 1686, under which it still operates. Bakers Hall in Harp Lane, Billingsgate, has been the site of the Guildhall of the bakers since 1506. It contains a courtroom where trade-related misdemeanours could be tried.

There are many such associated trades guilds, such as the Incorporation of Bakers, one of the fourteen Incorporated Trades of Glasgow, who meet in their Robert Adam designed Trades Hall. In the medieval town of Orvieto, bakers were one of the thirty-one organized crafts. Now largely ceremonial and charitable, these crafts and guilds formerly fulfilled the role of regulation much of which is now covered by local government.

The Bakers' Company ranks nineteenth in the order of precedence of Livery Companies. The company's motto is Praise God For All.

See also
 National Bakery School

External links
 Bakers Hall
 The Bakers' Company

Bakers
Baking industry
12th-century establishments in England